The United States National Arena Soccer Team is the indoor soccer team that represents the United States at international competitions. It is affiliated with Confederación Panamericana de Minifutbol (CPM) and the World Minifootball Federation (WMF). The first international arena match played by the U.S. National Arena Soccer Team was in July 2008 in Montreal,	 Canada where Mexico defeated the United States	 6–4. The first international arena soccer match in the United States was held in July 2009	 at NYTEX Sports Centre in North Richland Hills, Texas. The United States won the inaugural WMF World Cup in 2015 after going undefeated in group play	 defeating Germany and Romania in the knockout rounds en route to the final	 and prevailing over Mexico	 5–3	 in the final.  Goalkeeper Danny Waltman was named tournament MVP. The team also participated in the 2017 WMF World Cup, held in Tunisia.

Competitive record

WMF World Cup

Players

Current squad
The following 15 players were named to the squad for two friendlies against Mexico on October 28 and 29.

Recent call-ups
The following players have been called up for the team within the last twelve months.

References

Indoor soccer in the United States
Indoor soccer teams
Arena
Arena soccer